James Edward Fitzgerald may refer to:

 James FitzGerald (New Zealand politician) (1818–1896), New Zealand politician
 James Edward Fitzgerald (bishop) (1938–2003), American bishop